Ali Zurkanaevich Aliev (born 29 November 1937 – 7 January 1995) was a Soviet freestyle wrestler of Avar-Dagestani descent. He won five world titles and was the first wrestler from Dagestan to win a world title in freestyle wrestling. He competed at the 1960, 1964 and 1968 Olympic Games, finishing fourth and sixth. After his death, the Russian Wrestling Federation has hosted the annual Ali Aliev Memorial International Wrestling Meeting at the Ali Aliev Wrestling Training Center in Kaspiysk, Dagestan, Russia.

References

1937 births
1995 deaths
People from Gunibsky District
Sportspeople from Dagestan
Avar people
Recipients of the Order of the Red Banner of Labour
Soviet male sport wrestlers
Olympic wrestlers of the Soviet Union
World Wrestling Championships medalists
World Wrestling Champions
Wrestlers at the 1960 Summer Olympics
Wrestlers at the 1964 Summer Olympics
Wrestlers at the 1968 Summer Olympics